NSB El 2 was a series of two electric locomotives built by Norsk Elektrisk & Brown Boveri and Thune for the Norwegian State Railways in 1923. They remained in service until 1967. Neither has been preserved.

References
Jernbane.net entry on the El 2

El 02
Brown, Boveri & Cie locomotives
15 kV AC locomotives
Electric locomotives of Norway
Railway locomotives introduced in 1923
Standard gauge locomotives of Norway